Yeliz Yılmaz (born 19 August 1980) is a Turkish handballer playing in the Turkish Women's Handball Super League for Kastamonu Bld. GSK. She is a member of the Turkish national team. The  sportswomen is in the right back position.

Honors

Club
Yeliz Yılmaz played for several teams in Turkey, including Üsküdar Belediyespor (2000–2004, 2007–2013), Havelsan SK (2004–2006), Maltepe Bld. SK (2013–14), and 1907 Kanaryaspor (2014–15). She was also in Romania with CS Rulmentul Brasov (2006–07).

In June 2015, she transferred to Kastamonu Bld. GSK from 1907 Kanaryaspor.
In June 2017, she transferred to Üsküdar Bld. from Kastamonu Bld. GSK 
After she played 1 season for Üsküdar she went to Yalıkavak Spor Kulübü .
Since 2018 she is captain of the Yalıkavak Spor Kulübü.

She took part at the  Women's EHF Champions League (1997–98, 1998–99, 2005–06, 2006–07 and 2011–12), the Women's EHF Challenge Cup (2001–02, 2012–13, 2013–14 and 2015–16), the Women's EHF Cup (2002–03, 2005–06, 2006–07, 2007–08 and 2008–09) as well as the Women's EHF Cup Winners' Cup (2003–04, 2004–05, 2009–10, 2010–11 and 2011–12).

International
Yılmaz played more than 400 times for the Turkish National Team.
Yılmaz is part of the Turkey women's national handball team. She played at the 2012 European Women's Handball Championship qualification matches.

She was member of the silver medal-winning national team at the 2009 Mediterranean Games held in Pescara, Italy.

Yılmaz was part of the Turkey women's national beach handball team.

Honours

Club
 Turkish Women's Handball Super League
 Winners (4): 1997–98, 2003–04, 2004–05, 2010–11
 Runners-up (5): 2007–08, 2008–09, 2009–10, 2011–12, 2013–13

National
 Handball at the Mediterranean Games
 Runner-up (1): 2009

References 

1980 births
Sportspeople from Istanbul
Turkish female handball players
Turkish beach handball players
Turkey women's national handball players
Expatriate handball players
Turkish expatriate sportspeople in Romania
Üsküdar Belediyespor players
Kastamonu Bld. SK (women's handball) players
Living people
Mediterranean Games silver medalists for Turkey
Competitors at the 2009 Mediterranean Games
Mediterranean Games medalists in handball
21st-century Turkish women